Danish Red cattle, also known as Red Danish or Red Dane, are a major dairy cattle breed in northern Europe. There are 42,599 pedigree cows in Denmark. They can be used as a beef breed once they finish their useful lifetime.

The breed 
The breed was developed in Denmark based on local breeds bred with Angeln cattle from Angeln, Schleswig.  Danish Red cattle (and, earlier, Angeln cattle) have been imported to many other countries and have been used to improve and form many local breeds, such as Lithuanian Red, Estonian Red, Latvian Red, Polish Red, Belarus Red, Tambov Red (Russian Red), Bulgarian Red, etc.

The solid red color of these breeds has helped in making them popular for crossbreeding in tropical countries
with red Zebu dairy breeds like Sahiwal, Red Sindhi and Butana.  They are good milk cows, yielding milk with higher butter fat and protein content than the Holstein Friesian does.

Notes

External links
Composite Dairy Cattle Registry, USA

Cattle breeds originating in Denmark
Cattle breeds
Dairy cattle breeds
Red cattle
Dairy farming in Denmark